Gündoğmuş is a town and remote district of Antalya Province in the Mediterranean region of Turkey, 182 km from the city of Antalya, off the road from Akseki to Manavgat.

The town was previously a village named Eksere in the district of Akseki and was renamed Gündoğmuş in 1936.

Geography
Gündoğmuş stands in the foothills of the mountain Geyik Dağı, in the western Taurus Mountains. The mountainside is forested and the districted is split by the Alara River. The district has a warm Mediterranean climate with coolish winters due to the altitude.

Today this is an impoverished rural district as the nearby Mediterranean coast has drawn away successive generations in search of jobs in the tourist industry. The local economy depends on forestry, and money earned from seasonal jobs picking cotton or working in tourism in other parts of Turkey. There is no industry and little agriculture on this steep hillside, although grazing animals and beekeeping are important sources of income. Parts of the hillside are terraced for planting, but this is mainly vegetables for use at home.

Gündoğmuş is a small town with a high school and a boarding school for children from the most remote villages.

History
This area has been occupied since antiquity, and the site of the modern town of Gündoğmuş was settled by the ancient Romans.

Places of interest

The town of Gündoğmuş itself has the Ottoman Empire period mosque dedicated to Cem Sultan, an Ottoman prince who was at one time governor of this area.

And of course the area provides many opportunities for climbing, mountain walking and picnics in the forest.

References

External links
 District governor's official website 
 How to go to Gundogmus 

Populated places in Antalya Province
Districts of Antalya Province
Towns in Turkey